İlandağ is a mountain peak of the Lesser Caucasus range, located in the Julfa District of Nakhchivan, Azerbaijan. According to legend, the cleft in its summit was formed by the keel of Noah's Ark as the floodwaters abated.

See also 
 Mount Judi in southeast Anatolia, Turkey
 Mausoleum or Nuh or Noah
 The Sinjar Mountains in Nineveh Governorate, Iraq

References 

Two-thousanders of the Caucasus
Mountains of Azerbaijan
Noah's Ark